Martin Höhener (born June 23, 1980) is a Swiss former professional ice hockey defenceman. He was selected by the Nashville Predators in the 9th round (284th overall) of the 2000 NHL Entry Draft.

In 2002, he played for the Switzerland national ice hockey team in the Olympic Games in Salt Lake City, Utah.

Career statistics

Regular season and playoffs

International

References

External links

1980 births
Living people
EHC Basel players
EHC Bülach players
GCK Lions players
Genève-Servette HC players
HC Ambrì-Piotta players
HC Thurgau players
Ice hockey players at the 2002 Winter Olympics
EHC Kloten players
Nashville Predators draft picks
Olympic ice hockey players of Switzerland
SC Bern players
Ice hockey people from Zürich
Swiss ice hockey defencemen
ZSC Lions players